Miss Venezuela 2015 was the 62nd edition of the Miss Venezuela pageant held on October 8, 2015 at the Estudio 1 de Venevision in Caracas, Venezuela, after weeks of events. Outgoing titleholder Mariana Jiménez of Guárico crowned Mariam Habach of Lara as her successor.

This year, Osmel Sousa publicly announced that the winner of the pageant would carry a new crown model designed by George Wittels.

On October 9, TNT Latin America aired Miss Venezuela After Party, a special coverage with the events after the coronation. This is the last year Miss Venezuela Organization crowned Miss Tierra Venezuela.

Results 
Color key

Order of announcements
Top 10

Amazonas
Vargas
Yaracuy
Trujillo
Distrito Capital
Lara
Sucre
Guárico
Monagas
Zulia

Top 5

Vargas
Amazonas
Lara
Yaracuy
Trujillo

Special Awards on the final night

These awards were given during the telecast of the pageant on October 8:

Final Judges

There were eleven personalities in charge of electing the new Miss Venezuela.
 Mirla Castellanos – Venezuelan singer
 Nina Sicilia – Miss International 1985
 Alyz Henrich – Miss Earth 2013
 Giovanni Scutaro – Fashion designer
 Manuel Sáinz – Venezuelan journalist
 Bob Abreu – Venezuelan professional baseball player
 Laura Vieira - Venezuelan journalist
 George Wittels – Jewelry designer
 Alejandro Betancourt – Director of Communications P&G Venezuela
 Rahul Shrivastava – Ambassador of India in Venezuela
 Daniel Elbittar – Venezuelan actor

Official Contestants

Contestant Notes
 Mariam Habach unplaced in Miss Universe 2016 in Pasay, Metro Manila, Philippines.
 Jessica Duarte unplaced in Miss International 2016 in Tokyo, Japan.
 Andrea Rosales placed as Top 8 in Miss Earth 2015 in Vienna, Austria.
 Valeria Vespoli (Monagas) placed as 1st Runner-up in Miss Supranational 2016 in Krynica-Zdrój, Poland.
 Maydeliana Díaz (Sucre) won Reinado Internacional del Café 2016 in Manizales, Colombia.
 Ana Cristina Díaz (Mérida) placed as 4th Runner-up in Reinado Internacional del Café 2017 in Manizales, Colombia.
 Katherine García (Miranda) placed as 3rd Runner-up in Miss Intercontinental 2015 in Magdebourg, Germany.

Gala Interactiva de la Belleza (Interactive Beauty Gala)

This event took place on September 12, 2015 co-hosted by Mariela Celis and Juan Carlos García. The following awards were given:
 Miss Actitud Ésika (Ésika Miss Attitude) - María José Brito (Carabobo)
 Miss Autentica (Most Authentic) - Valeria Vespoli (Monagas)
 Miss Belleza Integral (Miss Integral Beauty) - Mariam Habach (Lara)
 Miss Cabello Radiante Pantene (Pantene Most Beautiful Hair) - Andrea Rosales (Amazonas)
 Miss Confianza (Miss Confidence) - Paula Schmidt (Guárico)
 Miss Online - Jessica Duarte (Trujillo)
 Miss Personalidad (Miss Personality) - Alvany Gonçalves (Bolivar)
 Miss Piernas De Venus (Venus Best Legs) - Yennifer González (Zulia)
 Miss Rostro L'Bel (L'Bel Most Beautiful Face) - Jessica Duarte (Trujillo)
 Miss Sonrisa (Most Beautiful Smile) - Katherine Oliveira (Distrito Capital)
 Miss Tecnologia (Miss Technology) - Mariana Méndez (Anzoátegui)

References

External links
Miss Venezuela Official Website

Miss Venezuela
Venezuela
2015 in Venezuela